, is a cel-shaded 2D style fighting game released in Japan only on April 4, 2004. It is not to be confused with Shaman King: Power of Spirit, a game produced by Konami to go along with the 4kids Entertainment dub.
It is a pseudo-sequel to Shaman King: Spirit of Shamans, a 2D fighting game for the PlayStation. This game is based upon the manga.
This is the last Shaman King game to be released in Japan.

Gameplay
Funbari Spirits features simple controls and plays like a 2D fighter despite being 3D. The modes include a 2 player mode, an adventure mode, a mini game mode, and a free play mode along with a training mode. The game also has the voice actors from the original anime, as well as cel-shaded graphics. All of the main characters are present as playable characters, along with a few characters that only appear in this game.

Characters
 Yoh Asakura
 Tao Ren
 Ryu
 Horohoro
 Faust VIII
 Chocolove
 Lyserg Diethel
 Marco
 Iron Maiden Jeanne
 Anna Kyoyama
 Manta Oyamada
 Hao Asakura
 Redseb (only appeared in the manga)
 Sati Saigan (only appeared in the manga)
 Sennjuu (from Hiroyuki Takei's first manga, Butsu Zone)

Reception
The game was criticized for having a tedious combat system.

External links
  Official Japanese Website
  Official Website Character section 3 with Exclusive Characters

2004 video games
Fighting games
Bandai games
Dimps games
Japan-exclusive video games
PlayStation 2 games
PlayStation 2-only games
Shaman King video games
Video games developed in Japan
Multiplayer and single-player video games